The Clash were an English punk rock band formed in 1976 initially consisting of Joe Strummer (lead vocals, guitar), Mick Jones (lead vocals, lead guitar), Paul Simonon (bass guitar), Keith Levene (guitar) and Terry Chimes (drums and percussion). Levene was dismissed in September 1976 and went on to form Public Image Ltd.  Terry Chimes performed intermittently as drummer for the first year of the band's existence, playing on the debut album. Topper Headon was recruited in May 1977 as the band's permanent drummer, forming the classic Clash line-up which would remain together until 1982.

Headon was dismissed in May 1982 due to drug addiction problems and Chimes returned in Headon's place.  Headon had often acted as a mediating force between the two strong personalities in the band, Strummer and Jones, and in his absence the band began to disintegrate.  In May 1983 Chimes left once more and was replaced by Pete Howard.  In September 1983, Mick Jones was dismissed due to continued conflict and infighting. Vince White and Nick Sheppard were recruited by band manager Bernard Rhodes as guitarists to replace the departing Jones.  The recording of their final album Cut the Crap was chaotic and there was little chemistry between the new group members and the remaining core of the band.  Strummer left before it was completed, leaving the final mixes to Rhodes.  After a short tour in support of the album in January 1985, the band went on hiatus, which became permanent when the band officially dissolved in 1986.

Band members

Classic line-up (May 1977 – May 1982)

Other members

Session members or groups

Timeline

Line-ups

References

See also

 
Clash